MotoGP is a racing game released for the PlayStation Portable based on the 2005 and 2006 MotoGP seasons. MotoGP was developed by Namco Bandai Games and was released in 2006. The game received average reviews with most critics focusing towards the graphics and gameplay.

Gameplay
MotoGP is a racing game featuring motorcycles and riders seen in the 2005 and 2006 MotoGP seasons. The game features the game modes Arcade, Time Trial, One on One, Multiplayer, and Season (Career) mode.

Reception

The game received "average" reviews according to the review aggregation website Metacritic. IGN said: "The season mode is as basic as it gets, and there isn't much besides that. The riding mechanics are fantastic, however, and that's what makes the game a nice pickup for motorcycle racing fans".  In Japan, Famitsu gave it a score of two eights, one seven, and one eight, for a total of 31 out of 40.

References

External links

2006 video games
Grand Prix motorcycle racing video games
Namco games
Racing video games
PlayStation Portable games
PlayStation Portable-only games
Grand Prix motorcycle racing
Video games developed in Japan